Tillman is a surname and given name of English origin and an Americanized spelling of Tillmann. Other variants of the name include Tilman and Dillman. Notable people with the name Tillmann include:

Surname 
 Albert Tillman (1928–2004), American educator, underwater diver, and author
 Alex Tillman (born 1991), Canadian football player
 Andre Tillman (born 1952), American football player
 Andy Tillman (born 1952), Oregon llama rancher, businessman, and author
 Barrett Tillman (born 1948), military historian and author
 Benjamin Tillman (1847–1918), governor and U.S. Senator from South Carolina
 Bob Tillman (1937–2000), American baseball player
 Cedric Tillman (Arizona Rattlers) (born 1970), American football player
 Cedric Tillman (Denver Broncos) (born 1970), American football player
 Charles Tillman (born 1981), American football player
 Charles Davis Tillman (1861–1943), gospel musician
 Chris Tillman (born 1988), American baseball pitcher
 Darryl Tillman (born 1967), American football player
 Dick Tillman (1936–2020), American sailor
 Dorothy Tillman (born 1947), American politician and civil rights activist
 Emma Tillman (1892–2007), American supercentenarian
 Eric Tillman (born 1957), Canadian football general manager
 George D. Tillman (1826–1902), South Carolina politician, brother of Benjamin
 Georgeanna Tillman (1944–1980), American singer
 Harrel Tillman (1925–1998), American actor, lawyer and judge
 Harold Tillman (born 1945), English retail entrepreneur and investor
 Henry Tillman (born 1960), American boxer
 James Tillman (disambiguation)
 James Tillman (baseball) (1919–2009), Negro league baseball player
 James Calvin Tillman, American former prisoner, exonerated of the crime for which he was imprisoned
 James D. Tillman (1841–1916), American Treasury official and politician
 James Fount Tillman (1854–1899), American diplomat and politician
 James H. Tillman (1869–1911), former Lieutenant Governor of South Carolina
 Jerome Tillman (born 1987), American basketball player
 Jerry W. Tillman (1940-2023), American politician
 John Tillman (disambiguation)
 John Tillman (athlete) (born 1965), American triple jumper
 John Tillman (lacrosse) (born c. 1970), American lacrosse coach
 John Tillman (policy), American nonprofit executive
 John Tillman Lamkin (1811–1870), American politician
 John N. Tillman (1859–1929), U.S. Representative from Arkansas
 John T. Tilman (1845–1905), American politician in the Virginia House of Delegates
 Johnny Tillman (1893–1964), Major League Baseball player
 Josh Tillman (born 1981), American singer-songwriter
 Juliann Jane Tillman, American preacher
 Justin Tillman (born 1996), American basketball player
 Katherine D. Tillman (1870–1923), American writer
 Larry Tillman ( 1934–1950), an American professional wrestler and promoter
 Lewis Tillman (1816–1886), American politician
 Lynne Tillman (born 1947), novelist, short story writer, and cultural critic
 Malik Tillman (born 2002), German footballer
 Martin Tillman (born 1964), Swiss cellist and composer
 Mary Tillman Smith (1904–1995), American artist
 Nancy Tillman (born 1954), American author and illustrator
 Pat Tillman (1976–2004), American football player and soldier
 Paula Gately Tillman (born 1946), American photographer
 Pete Tillman (1922–1998), American football coach
 Richard J. Tillman (1911–1983), American politician
 Rusty Tillman (1946–2021), American football player
 Samuel Escue Tillman (1847–1942), American military educator and author
 Spencer Tillman (born 1964), American football player
 Thore Tillman (1915–2004)
 Timothy Tillman (born 1999), footballer
 Tony Tillman (born 1981), American musician
 Travares Tillman (born 1977), American football player
 Wheeler Mellette Tillman (born 1941), American politician
 William Tillman (1830s–?), American mariner
 Xavier Tillman (born 1999), American basketball player

Given name 
 Tillman Davis Johnson (1858–1953), United States District Judge for the District of Utah
 Tillman Sease (1916–1988), American football and baseball coach

See also 
 
 
 Tillmann, given name and surname
 Tilman, given name and surname

References